Mathematical induction is a method for proving that a statement  is true for every natural number , that is, that the infinitely many cases   all hold. Informal metaphors help to explain this technique, such as falling dominoes or climbing a ladder:

A proof by induction consists of two cases. The first, the base case, proves the statement for  without assuming any knowledge of other cases. The second case, the induction step, proves that if the statement holds for any given case , then it must also hold for the next case . These two steps establish that the statement holds for every natural number .

The method can be extended to prove statements about more general well-founded structures, such as trees; this generalization, known as structural induction, is used in mathematical logic and computer science. Mathematical induction in this extended sense is closely related to recursion. Mathematical induction is an inference rule used in formal proofs, and is the foundation of most correctness proofs for computer programs.

Although its name may suggest otherwise, mathematical induction should not be confused with inductive reasoning as used in philosophy (see Problem of induction). The mathematical method examines infinitely many cases to prove a general statement, but does so by a finite chain of deductive reasoning involving the variable , which can take infinitely many values.

History 
In 370 BC, Plato's Parmenides may have contained traces of an early example of an implicit inductive proof. An opposite iterated technique, counting down rather than up, is found in the sorites paradox, where it was argued that if 1,000,000 grains of sand formed a heap, and removing one grain from a heap left it a heap, then a single grain of sand (or even no grains) forms a heap.

The earliest implicit proof by mathematical induction is in the al-Fakhri written by al-Karaji around 1000 AD, who applied it to arithmetic sequences to prove the binomial theorem and properties of Pascal's triangle.

 As Katz says 

In India, early implicit proofs by mathematical induction appear in Bhaskara's "cyclic method".

None of these ancient mathematicians, however, explicitly stated the induction hypothesis. Another similar case (contrary to what Vacca has written, as Freudenthal carefully showed) was that of Francesco Maurolico in his Arithmeticorum libri duo (1575), who used the technique to prove that the sum of the first n odd integers is n2.

The earliest rigorous use of induction was by Gersonides (1288–1344). The first explicit formulation of the principle of induction was given by Pascal in his Traité du triangle arithmétique (1665). Another Frenchman, Fermat, made ample use of a related principle: indirect proof by infinite descent.

The induction hypothesis was also employed by the Swiss Jakob Bernoulli, and from then on it became well known. The modern formal treatment of the principle came only in the 19th century, with George Boole, Augustus De Morgan, Charles Sanders Peirce, Giuseppe Peano, and Richard Dedekind.

Description 
The proof consists of two steps:
 The base case (or initial case): prove that the statement holds for 0, or 1.

The hypothesis in the induction step, that the statement holds for a particular , is called the induction hypothesis or inductive hypothesis.

Authors who prefer to define natural numbers to begin at 0 use that value in the base case; those who define natural numbers to begin at 1 use that value.

Examples

Sum of consecutive natural numbers 
Mathematical induction can be used to prove the following statement P(n) for all natural numbers n.
 

Proposition. For every , 

Proof. Let P(n) be the statement  We give a proof by induction on n.

Base case: Show that the statement holds for the smallest natural number n = 0.

P(0) is clearly true: 

Induction step: Show that for every k ≥ 0, if P(k) holds, then P(k + 1) also holds.

Assume the induction hypothesis that for a particular k, the single case n = k holds, meaning P(k) is true:It follows that:
 

Algebraically, the right hand side simplifies as:
 

Equating the extreme left hand and right hand sides, we deduce that:That is, the statement P(k + 1) also holds true, establishing the induction step.

Conclusion: Since both the base case and the induction step have been proved as true, by mathematical induction the statement P(n) holds for every natural number n. ∎

A trigonometric inequality 
Induction is often used to prove inequalities. As an example, we prove that  for any real number  and natural number .

Proposition.

Proof. Fix an arbitrary real number , and let  be the statement .

Base case: The calculation  verifies .

Induction step: We show the implication  for any natural number . Assume the induction hypothesis: for a given value , the single case  is true. Using the angle addition formula and the triangle inequality, we deduce:
 

The inequality between the extreme left-hand and right-hand quantities shows that  is true, which completes the induction step.

Conclusion: The proposition  holds for all natural numbers . ∎

Variants 

In practice, proofs by induction are often structured differently, depending on the exact nature of the property to be proven.
All variants of induction are special cases of transfinite induction; see below.

Base case other than 0 or 1 
If one wishes to prove a statement, not for all natural numbers, but only for all numbers  greater than or equal to a certain number , then the proof by induction consists of the following:
 Showing that the statement holds when .

In this way, one can prove that some statement  holds for all , or even for all . This form of mathematical induction is actually a special case of the previous form, because if the statement to be proved is  then proving it with these two rules is equivalent with proving  for all natural numbers  with an induction base case .

Example: forming dollar amounts by coins 
Assume an infinite supply of 4- and 5-dollar coins. Induction can be used to prove that any whole amount of dollars greater than or equal to  can be formed by a combination of such coins. Let  denote the statement " dollars can be formed by a combination of 4- and 5-dollar coins".

Assume  is true for some arbitrary . If there is a solution for  dollars that includes at least one 4-dollar coin, replace it by a 5-dollar coin to make  dollars. Otherwise, if only 5-dollar coins are used,  must be a multiple of 5 and so at least 15; but then we can replace three 5-dollar coins by four 4-dollar coins to make  dollars. In each case,  is true.

Therefore, by the principle of induction,  holds for all , and the proof is complete.

Induction on more than one counter 
It is sometimes desirable to prove a statement involving two natural numbers, n and m, by iterating the induction process. That is, one proves a base case and an induction step for n, and in each of those proves a base case and an induction step for m. See, for example, the proof of commutativity accompanying addition of natural numbers. More complicated arguments involving three or more counters are also possible.

Infinite descent 

The method of infinite descent is a variation of mathematical induction which was used by Pierre de Fermat. It is used to show that some statement Q(n) is false for all natural numbers n. Its traditional form consists of showing that if Q(n) is true for some natural number n, it also holds for some strictly smaller natural number m. Because there are no infinite decreasing sequences of natural numbers, this situation would be impossible, thereby showing (by contradiction) that Q(n) cannot be true for any n.

The validity of this method can be verified from the usual principle of mathematical induction. Using mathematical induction on the statement P(n) defined as "Q(m) is false for all natural numbers m less than or equal to n", it follows that P(n) holds for all n, which means that Q(n) is false for every natural number n.

Prefix induction 
The most common form of proof by mathematical induction requires proving in the induction step that
 

whereupon the induction principle "automates" n applications of this step in getting from P(0) to P(n). This could be called "predecessor induction" because each step proves something about a number from something about that number's predecessor.

A variant of interest in computational complexity is "prefix induction", in which one proves the following statement in the induction step:
 
or equivalently
 

The induction principle then "automates" log2 n applications of this inference in getting from P(0) to P(n). In fact, it is called "prefix induction" because each step proves something about a number from something about the "prefix" of that number — as formed by truncating the low bit of its binary representation. It can also be viewed as an application of traditional induction on the length of that binary representation.

If traditional predecessor induction is interpreted computationally as an n-step loop, then prefix induction would correspond to a log-n-step loop. Because of that, proofs using prefix induction are "more feasibly constructive" than proofs using predecessor induction.

Predecessor induction can trivially simulate prefix induction on the same statement. Prefix induction can simulate predecessor induction, but only at the cost of making the statement more syntactically complex (adding a bounded universal quantifier), so the interesting results relating prefix induction to polynomial-time computation depend on excluding unbounded quantifiers entirely, and limiting the alternation of bounded universal and existential quantifiers allowed in the statement.

One can take the idea a step further: one must prove
 

whereupon the induction principle "automates" log log n applications of this inference in getting from P(0) to P(n). This form of induction has been used, analogously, to study log-time parallel computation.

Complete (strong) induction 
The name "strong induction" does not mean that this method can prove more than "weak induction", but merely refers to the stronger hypothesis used in the induction step.

In fact, it can be shown that the two methods are actually equivalent, as explained below. In this form of complete induction, one still has to prove the base case, and it may even be necessary to prove extra-base cases such as  before the general argument applies, as in the example below of the Fibonacci number .

Although the form just described requires one to prove the base case, this is unnecessary if one can prove  (assuming  for all lower ) for all . This is a special case of transfinite induction as described below, although it is no longer equivalent to ordinary induction. In this form the base case is subsumed by the case , where  is proved with no other  assumed;
In this method, however, it is vital to ensure that the proof of  does not implicitly assume that , e.g. by saying "choose an arbitrary ", or by assuming that a set of m elements has an element.

Complete induction is equivalent to ordinary mathematical induction as described above, in the sense that a proof by one method can be transformed into a proof by the other. Let  be the statement " holds for all  such that ".

Example: Fibonacci numbers 
Complete induction is most useful when several instances of the inductive hypothesis are required for each induction step. For example, complete induction can be used to show that
 

Example: prime factorization 
Another proof by complete induction uses the hypothesis that the statement holds for all smaller  more thoroughly. Consider the statement that "every natural number greater than 1 is a product of (one or more) prime numbers", which is the "existence" part of the fundamental theorem of arithmetic. For proving the induction step, the induction hypothesis is that for a given  the statement holds for all smaller . Thus  is a product of products of primes, and hence by extension a product of primes itself.

Example: dollar amounts revisited 
We shall look to prove the same example as above, this time with strong induction. The statement remains the same:
 

However, there will be slight differences in the structure and the assumptions of the proof, starting with the extended base case.

Proof.

 

The base case holds.

Prove that  holds.

Choosing , and observing that  shows that  holds, by the inductive hypothesis. Then, simply adding a  dollar coin to that combination yields the sum . That is,  holds. ∎

Forward-backward induction 

However, proving the validity of the statement for no single number suffices to establish the base case; instead, one needs to prove the statement for an infinite subset of the natural numbers. For example, Augustin Louis Cauchy first used forward (regular) induction to prove the
inequality of arithmetic and geometric means for all powers of 2, and then used backwards induction to show it for all natural numbers.

Example of error in the induction step 

The induction step must be proved for all values of n. To illustrate this, Joel E. Cohen proposed the following argument, which purports to prove by mathematical induction that all horses are of the same color:

Base case: in a set of only one horse, there is only one color.

Induction step: assume as induction hypothesis that within any set of  horses, there is only one color. Now look at any set of  horses. Number them: . Each is a set of only  horses, therefore within each there is only one color. But the two sets overlap, so there must be only one color among all  horses.

The base case  is trivial, and the induction step is correct in all cases .

Formalization  
In second-order logic, one can write down the "axiom of induction" as follows:
 ,
where P(.) is a variable for predicates involving one natural number and k and n are variables for natural numbers.

In words, the base case  and the induction step (namely, that the induction hypothesis  implies ) together imply that  for any natural number . The axiom of induction asserts the validity of inferring that  holds for any natural number  from the base case and the induction step.

The first quantifier in the axiom ranges over predicates rather than over individual numbers. This is a second-order quantifier, which means that this axiom is stated in second-order logic. Axiomatizing arithmetic induction in first-order logic requires an axiom schema containing a separate axiom for each possible predicate. The article Peano axioms contains further discussion of this issue.

The axiom of structural induction for the natural numbers was first formulated by Peano, who used it to specify the natural numbers together with the following four other axioms:

 0 is a natural number.
 The successor function  of every natural number yields a natural number .
 The successor function is injective.

In first-order ZFC set theory, quantification over predicates is not allowed, but one can still express induction by quantification over sets:
 
 may be read as a set representing a proposition, and containing natural numbers, for which the proposition holds. This is not an axiom, but a theorem, given that natural numbers are defined in the language of ZFC set theory by axioms, analogous to Peano's.

Transfinite induction 

One variation of the principle of complete induction can be generalized for statements about elements of any well-founded set, that is, a set with an irreflexive relation < that contains no infinite descending chains. Every set representing an ordinal number is well-founded, the set of natural numbers is one of them.

Applied to a well-founded set, transfinite induction can be formulated as a single step. To prove that a statement P(n) holds for each ordinal number:
 Show, for each ordinal number n, that if P(m) holds for all , then P(n) also holds.

This form of induction, when applied to a set of ordinal numbers (which form a well-ordered and hence well-founded class), is called transfinite induction. It is an important proof technique in set theory, topology and other fields.

Proofs by transfinite induction typically distinguish three cases:
 when n is a minimal element, i.e. there is no element smaller than n;
 when n has a direct predecessor, i.e. the set of elements which are smaller than n has a largest element;
 when n has no direct predecessor, i.e. n is a so-called limit ordinal.

Strictly speaking, it is not necessary in transfinite induction to prove a base case, because it is a vacuous special case of the proposition that if P is true of all , then P is true of m. It is vacuously true precisely because there are no values of  that could serve as counterexamples. So the special cases are special cases of the general case.

Relationship to the well-ordering principle 
The principle of mathematical induction is usually stated as an axiom of the natural numbers; see Peano axioms. It is strictly stronger than the well-ordering principle in the context of the other Peano axioms. Suppose the following:
 The trichotomy axiom: For any natural numbers n and m, n is less than or equal to m if and only if m is not less than n.
 For any natural number n,  is greater .
 No natural number is less than zero.

It can then be proved that induction, given the above-listed axioms, implies the well-ordering principle. The following proof uses complete induction and the first and fourth axioms.

Proof. Suppose there exists a non-empty set, S, of natural numbers that has no least element. Then if  is false  is in S, thus being a minimal element in S, a contradiction. Thus  is true. Therefore, by the complete induction principle, P(n) holds for all natural numbers n; so S is empty, a contradiction. ∎

On the other hand, the set , shown in the picture, is well-ordered by the lexicographic order.
Then the base case P(0, 0) is trivially true, and so is the induction step: if , then . However, P is not true for all pairs in the set.

Peano's axioms with the induction principle uniquely model the natural numbers. Replacing the induction principle with the well-ordering principle allows for more exotic models that fulfill all the axioms.

It is mistakenly printed in several books and sources that the well-ordering principle is equivalent to the induction axiom. In the context of the other Peano axioms, this is not the case, but in the context of other axioms, they are equivalent; specifically, the well-ordering principle implies the induction axiom in the context of the first two above listed axioms and

A common mistake in many erroneous proofs is to assume that  is a unique and well-defined natural number, a property which is not implied by the other Peano axioms.

See also 
 Combinatorial proof
 Induction puzzles
 Proof by exhaustion
 Recursion
 Recursion (computer science)
 Structural induction
 Transfinite induction

Notes

References

Introduction 
  (Ch. 8.)
 
 
  (Section 1.2.1: Mathematical Induction, pp. 11–21.)
  (Section 3.8: Transfinite induction, pp. 28–29.)

History 
 
 
 
 
 
 
 
  Reprinted (CP 3.252–288), (W 4:299–309)
 
 
 
 
 
 
 
 
 

 
Articles containing proofs